Arria NLG plc is a New Zealand based company with headquarters in the US. Arria offers Artificial Intelligence technology in data analytics and information delivery. It is one of the pioneering companies in the space of automatic text generation, with a focus on Natural Language Generation (NLG). When it floated on London's Alternative Investment Market (AIM) in December 2013, it was valued at over £160 million.  However, Arria was later delisted from the stock exchange. Subsequently Arria has raised over US $100 million from private sources. Arria's technology is based on three decades of scientific research in the field of Natural Language Generation (NLG).

History 
The company was founded in 2009 under the name Data2Text Limited by Professor Ehud Reiter, Senior Lecturer Dr Yaji Sripada, and post-doctoral researcher Dr Ross Turner from the NLG research group at the University of Aberdeen, and meteorologist/entrepreneur Ian Davy.
In May 2012, Data2Text joined forces with a specialist software development and marketing firm, Arria NLG (then a limited company), which took a 20% stake in Data2Text. In late 2013, Arria NLG acquired the remaining 80% of Data2Text, and in December 2013 Arria NLG converted to a public listed company and was floated on the AIM.
In September 2018, Arria shareholders approved a scheme of arrangement that placed a New Zealand holding company (Arria NLG Limited) over the original Arria UK company and its direct subsidiary, now known as Arria Data2Text Limited. In late 2018 Arria located its global headquarters in Morristown, New Jersey, and now maintains offices in New Zealand, Scotland, Australia, and British Columbia, Canada.

Technology/Science 
Arria's technology analyzes large datasets to derive patterns, facts and insights, before structuring this information in the best possible manner to build a narrative expressed in written text or voice that is valuable, fluent and informative says Neil Burnett, CTO to Arria NLG. To reach this goal, the Arria NLG Engine, a cloud-based enterprise software platform, automatically recognises patterns in large volumes of complex data, which are then distilled into a narrative description of the most significant information. The NLG Engine consists of two components:
 The analysis and interpretation component takes raw transactional or sensor data and turns it into information using rules based on the knowledge of a domain expert. 
 The NLG component communicates this information in natural language, based on general linguistic rules augmented with industry-specific terminology and usage.

Arria NLG's capabilities are rooted in the scientific research conducted since the 1980s by its founder and Chief Scientist, Professor Ehud Reiter, and former Chief Technology Officer Dr Robert Dale.

Arria  has been awarded over 40 US patents in the NLG field.

Among Arria's founders are Professor Ehud Reiter and Dr Yaji Sripada, both currently teaching and researching in the Department of Computing Science at the University of Aberdeen. Reiter, Arria's Chief Scientist, holds a PhD from Harvard and founded the NLG research group in Aberdeen, one of the world's most renowned research groups on Natural language generation. Dr Robert Dale briefly Arria's CTO, left Arria in 2017.

Applications 
Data2Text Limited originally focussed on automatically producing meteorological reports based on numerical weather forecast data, but quickly extended its offerings to the conversion of vast amounts of data from oil and gas platforms into natural language reports for engineers and operators, with the UK's Met Office and Shell US being among its main clients.
More recently, Arria NLG has signed a contract with FarmLink to produce narrative reports to optimise agricultural yield potential, as well as a proof-of-concept agreement to provide data intelligence to aircraft engine maintenance staff. The group is also developing applications providing automatic analysis and reporting capabilities for fraud detection, risk mitigation and compliance to the banking industry.

See also  
 Natural language generation
 Natural language processing
 Natural language understanding
 Computational linguistics
 Computational Linguistics (journal)
 Analytics
 Big data
 Data analysis

External links 
 Official Website.
 University of Aberdeen Natural Language Generation group.
 Ehud Reiter’s research page.
 Yaji Sripada’s research page.
 Robert Dale’s research page.

References 

Companies based in Aberdeen
Natural language generation